A Través de Tus Ojos (Eng.: "Through Your Eyes") is the thirteenth studio album released by Los Bukis on October 18, 1991. It received a Grammy Award nomination for Best Latin Pop Album.

Track listing

All songs written and composed by Marco Antonio Solís

Personnel 
Marco Antonio Solís – vocals, rhythm guitar
Joel Solis – lead guitar
Roberto Guadarrama – keyboards
Eusebio "El Chivo" Cortez – bass
Jose "Pepe" Guadarrama –  percussion and additional keyboards
Pedro Sanchez – drums

References

External links
 A Través de Tus Ojos on amazon.com
 A Través de Tus Ojos on cduniverse.com

Los Bukis albums
1991 albums
Fonovisa Records albums